A 20th Century Chocolate Cake is a Canadian comedy docufiction film, directed by Lois Siegel and released in 1983. The film stars Greg Van Riel and Charles Fisch Jr. as Greg and Charles, two young men in Montreal who are trying to find creative fulfillment in their professional lives. Greg pursues work as a freelance writer of human interest journalism, while the openly gay Charles takes a job as a dancer in a gay bar.

The film was an expansion of an earlier short film, Recipe to Cook a Clown, which Siegel, Van Riel, and Fisch had made together in the 1970s. Due to budgetary limitations, the film took over three years to make, went through a dozen different cinematographers, and was shot predominantly on stray ends of donated film from other film projects.

André Vincelli received Genie Award nominations for Best Original Score and Best Original Song at the 5th Genie Awards in 1984.

References

External links 
 

1983 films
Canadian comedy films
Canadian docufiction films
Canadian LGBT-related films
LGBT-related comedy films
1983 LGBT-related films
English-language Canadian films
Films set in Montreal
Films shot in Montreal
1980s English-language films
1980s Canadian films